Senino is a rural locality (a village) in Styopantsevskoye Rural Settlement, Vyaznikovsky District, Vladimir Oblast, Russia. The population was 1 as of 2010.

Geography 
Senino is located 34 km southwest of Vyazniki (the district's administrative centre) by road. Korovintsevo is the nearest rural locality.

References 

Rural localities in Vyaznikovsky District